In Greek mythology, Prothous (Ancient Greek: Πρόθοος Prothoös) may refer to:

Prothous, an Arcadian prince as one of the 50 sons of the impious King Lycaon either by the naiad Cyllene, Nonacris or by unknown woman. He and his brothers were the most nefarious and carefree of all people. To test them, Zeus visited them in the form of a peasant. These brothers mixed the entrails of a child into the god's meal, whereupon the enraged Zeus threw the meal over the table. Aegaeon was killed, along with his brothers and their father, by a lightning bolt of the god.
Prothous, son of Thestius and brother of Althaea. He was one of the Calydonian Boar Hunters.
Prothous, son of the Aetolian Agrius, killed by Diomedes.
Prothous of Argos, a warrior in the army of the Seven against Thebes. He cast lots to assign places in the chariot race at the funeral games of Opheltes.
Prothous, a defender of Thebes against the Seven, killed by Tydeus.
Prothous, son of Tenthredon and either Eurymache or Cleobule the daughter of Eurytus. He was one of the commander of the Magnetes who dwelt around mount Pelion and the river Peneus and one of the Greek leaders in the Trojan War. Prothous brought forty ships to Troy. According to one version, Prothous, together with Meges and a number of others, died as a result of a shipwreck near Cape Caphereus of Euboea; in another version, Prothous, Eurypylus and Guneus ended up in Libya and settled there.
Prothous, one of the Suitors of Penelope who came from Same along with other 22 wooers. He, with the other suitors, was killed by Odysseus with the aid of Eumaeus, Philoetius, and Telemachus.

Notes

References 

 Apollodorus, The Library with an English Translation by Sir James George Frazer, F.B.A., F.R.S. in 2 Volumes, Cambridge, MA, Harvard University Press; London, William Heinemann Ltd. 1921. . Online version at the Perseus Digital Library. Greek text available from the same website.
Conon, Fifty Narrations, surviving as one-paragraph summaries in the Bibliotheca (Library) of Photius, Patriarch of Constantinople translated from the Greek by Brady Kiesling. Online version at the Topos Text Project.
 Dictys Cretensis, from The Trojan War. The Chronicles of Dictys of Crete and Dares the Phrygian translated by Richard McIlwaine Frazer, Jr. (1931-). Indiana University Press. 1966. Online version at the Topos Text Project.
 Gaius Julius Hyginus, Fabulae from The Myths of Hyginus translated and edited by Mary Grant. University of Kansas Publications in Humanistic Studies. Online version at the Topos Text Project.
 Homer, The Iliad with an English Translation by A.T. Murray, Ph.D. in two volumes. Cambridge, MA., Harvard University Press; London, William Heinemann, Ltd. 1924. Online version at the Perseus Digital Library.
 Homer, Homeri Opera in five volumes. Oxford, Oxford University Press. 1920. Greek text available at the Perseus Digital Library.
 Pausanias, Description of Greece with an English Translation by W.H.S. Jones, Litt.D., and H.A. Ormerod, M.A., in 4 Volumes. Cambridge, MA, Harvard University Press; London, William Heinemann Ltd. 1918. . Online version at the Perseus Digital Library
Pausanias, Graeciae Descriptio. 3 vols. Leipzig, Teubner. 1903.  Greek text available at the Perseus Digital Library.
 Publius Papinius Statius, The Thebaid translated by John Henry Mozley. Loeb Classical Library Volumes. Cambridge, MA, Harvard University Press; London, William Heinemann Ltd. 1928. Online version at the Topos Text Project.
 Publius Papinius Statius, The Thebaid. Vol I-II. John Henry Mozley. London: William Heinemann; New York: G.P. Putnam's Sons. 1928. Latin text available at the Perseus Digital Library.
Tzetzes, John, Allegories of the Iliad translated by Goldwyn, Adam J. and Kokkini, Dimitra. Dumbarton Oaks Medieval Library, Harvard University Press, 2015. 

Princes in Greek mythology
Sons of Lycaon
Achaean Leaders
Thessalians in the Trojan War
People of the Trojan War
Suitors of Penelope
Aetolian characters in Greek mythology
Arcadian characters in Greek mythology
Argive characters in Greek mythology
Theban characters in Greek mythology
Ancient Magnesia
Arcadian mythology